How Would a Patriot Act? Defending American Values from a President Run Amok is a New York Times best selling book by the constitutional lawyer and journalist Glenn Greenwald published in May 2006.  Greenwald attacks what he argues is the illegal activity of the Bush administration in warrantless wiretapping and other matters, providing citations from Supreme Court decisions, Congressional statements, and writings by the Founding Fathers of the United States.

It is the first book published by Working Assets.

References

External links 
 Read the preface
 Unclaimed Territory (Greenwald's blog) Jennifer Nix, the editor of the book, discusses how it came to be
 San Francisco Chronicle
 Publishers Weekly
 National Review Online
 Book review at Mises.org Written by David Gordon.  Originally appeared in The Mises Review (Winter 2007) a periodical published by the Ludwig von Mises Institute.

2006 non-fiction books
Books about George W. Bush
Books by Glenn Greenwald